Larry Taylor (born June 25, 1960) is a former Republican member of the Texas Senate. He was a member of the Texas House of Representatives from District 24 in Galveston County from 2003 to 2012.

Early life, education, and career
Born and raised in Friendswood and a graduate of Friendswood High School. He then went on an attended to Baylor University, where he received a BBA in Business Administration in 1982. Since then he has helped managed and own his fathers insurance company in Friendswood.

In 2011, Taylor caused a controversy when he told the Texas Windstorm Insurance Association to be fair to policy holders and not "nitpick or Jew them down". He subsequently apologized for the slur, but was criticized by Democratic state representative Lon Burnam.

Taylor became chairman of the Texas Conservative Coalition Research Institute in February 2015.

References

External links
 Campaign website
 State legislative page

1960 births
Living people
Republican Party Texas state senators
Republican Party members of the Texas House of Representatives
21st-century American politicians
Baylor University alumni
People from Galveston, Texas
People from Friendswood, Texas